Periods of heavy rainfall caused by multiple atmospheric rivers in California between December 31, 2022 and January 25, 2023 resulted in floods that 
affected parts of Southern California, the California Central Coast, Northern California and Nevada. The flooding resulted in property damage and at least 22 fatalities, making it the deadliest U.S. meteorological event of 2023 to date.

At least 200,000 homes and business lost power because of the storm and 6,000 individuals were ordered to evacuate. The floods were widely reported by media as an example of how climate change is increasing extreme changes in weather, especially cycles of precipitation and drought. Scientists interviewed by Los Angeles Times said that further study is needed to determine the connection and California has recorded similar events almost every decade since records started in the 19th century. . Other scientists have emphasized that floods were caused by ocean warming, directly related to climate change.  Scientist Kevin Trenberth declared that "the interaction between the warming ocean and the overlying atmosphere (...) is producing these prodigious rainfalls that have occurred in so many places around the world recently". Climate change is intensifying the water cycle. This brings more intense rainfall and associated flooding, as well as more intense drought in many regions. It has been both predicted by scientists and observed in the last years and documented by the IPCC (International Panel for Climate Change 6th assessment report).  .  Before the rains started, California had been in an extreme drought.

Due to the storms, Governor Gavin Newsom declared a state of emergency on January 4, 2023. President Joe Biden then declared a state of emergency in 17 California counties on January 9, 2023. That same day, two lawmakers sent a letter urging President Biden to declare a state of emergency for San Luis Obispo County and Santa Barbara County. Biden approved a major disaster declaration for Santa Cruz, Sacramento and Merced counties on January 14. Monterey, San Luis Obispo and Santa Barbara counties were added a few days later to the declaration. Later, Ventura County was approved disaster relief. Biden surveyed the damage with Newsom on January 19. Accuweather estimated the costs of California floods to $31 billion to $34 billion on January 10. This estimate is preliminary and will be finalized later in 2023 by the National Oceanic and Atmospheric Administration.

Precipitation totals

Impacts

California 
Over 40 state parks in California were completely closed, and one national park was also closed, Redwood National Park. Dozens of Amtrak trains were delayed, ran on modified schedules, or cancelled entirely due to the floods as well.

San Francisco Bay Area 

The Santa Cruz Branch Rail Line sustained major damage. US 101  was flooded in South San Francisco, California, while SR 84 was closed due to landslides and flooding in Fremont. This forced the Oakland Zoo to close until at least January 17. Flooding and road washouts were widely reported. Flooding was exacerbated by the series of storms as they exceeded the soil’s capacity to soak up water.

A 2-year-old boy in Occidental, California died from his injuries after a tree descended on his family house. A weather station in Nicasio recorded a wind gust of  during what forecasts described a "bomb cyclone" on January 4.

Sacramento Valley 

A levee along the Cosumnes River broke, resulting in the South Sacramento (99) Freeway being flooded. Evacuations were ordered in Wilton. Several people were trapped in their cars and had to be rescued. Three people were killed from flooding on the roads. The levee failures were traced to a private property.

Wind gusts of over  knocked down trees and caused widespread power outages that affected over 500,000 SMUD and PG&E customers. On January 10, a brief EF1 tornado caused extensive damage to softwood and hardwood trees northeast of Milton. On January 14, a brief EF0 tornado near Clay damaged the roofs of two garages and uplifted a wall-less RV structure, which caused it to collapse. Two people were killed when trees fell on them due to the high winds. A total of five people died from the storms in Sacramento County, making it the hardest-hit county in the state. The Sacramento Zoo closed on January 10 due to storm damage.

Southern California 
Evacuations were issued for Ventura County and Santa Barbara counties, including Montecito (which had experienced the deadly 2018 mudflows). Multiple highways, including I-5, SR 126, and US 101, were closed, and a sinkhole that swallowed two cars opened up near Chatsworth. The SoFi Stadium, which hosted the 2023 College Football Playoff National Championship, experienced rain. In Los Angeles, Union Station's main concourse flooded.

Central California 
The Central Coast experienced widespread flooding. A flash flood outside of Paso Robles swept away a five-year-old boy who was on his way to school. He and his mother had exited their vehicle and rescuers were only able to reach his mother. After a seven-hour search, only one of his shoes was found. The main coastal rail line that connects the San Francisco Bay Area to Los Angeles was closed down when a bridge at Honda Point within Vandenberg Space Force Base had to undergo several weeks of repairs due to the flooding that had eroded the earth that supports the bridge’s footings. A section of the bridge over Sespe Creek near Fillmore washed away on January 10, preventing the movement of freight trains on the Santa Paula Branch Line. State Route 33 was closed after a washout damaged the roadway. Several portions of the highway were also covered in muddy debris along with other local highways in Ventura County. The Santa Barbara Municipal Airport was closed due to flooding. The Salinas River filled above flood levels, resulting in road closures of bridges in Paso Robles and causing a levee to break near Salinas. In Merced, evacuations were ordered throughout the area because of an overflow at the nearby Bear Creek. In Bishop, the city exceeded its annual precipitation average by January 11 due to the floods.

Other states

Nevada 
Flood watches were issued for Northern Nevada. In parts of the Sierra Nevada,  of snow fell in just one hour. Reno, Nevada recorded its third wettest day on record.

Arizona 
Flooding from Oak Creek impacted the community of Cornville in Yavapai County, Arizona, on January 1 due to heavy rain hitting the area.

Utah 
The city of Draper, Utah, experienced flooding on the night of January 10 when heavy rains moved through the city. More than 30 homes were inundated as several inches of rain fell.

See also
 Weather of 2023
 2017 California floods
 2022–23 North American winter
 December 2022 North American winter storm
 July–August 2022 United States floods
 ARkStorm

References

2022 floods in the United States
2023 floods in the United States
2022 meteorology
2023 meteorology
2022 in California
2023 in California
December 2022 events in the United States
January 2023 events in the United States
2022-2023